The Bharatiya Janata Party, or simply,  BJP Meghalaya (BJP;), 
is the state unit of the Bharatiya Janata Party of the Meghalaya. Its head office is situated at the 3rd Floor, Opp.Passport Seva Kendra Lower Lachumiere, Shillong-793 001, Meghalaya India. The current president of BJP Meghalaya is Ernest Mawrie.

In General Election

In State Election

In Local Elections

Autonomous District Council election

See also
Bharatiya Janata Party
National Democratic Alliance
North East Democratic Alliance
Meghalaya Democratic Alliance
National People's Party	
United Democratic Party
People's Democratic Front
Hill State People's Democratic Party
Organisation of the Bharatiya Janata Party

References 

Meghalaya
Political parties in Meghalaya